Desert oak may refer to several Australian tree species with narrow, needle-like leaves or stems, including:

 Acacia coriacea
 Acacia sericophylla
 Allocasuarina decaisneana